Manulea costalis is a moth of the family Erebidae. It is found in Albania, Bulgaria, Serbia, North Macedonia, Greece and on Crete, as well as in Turkey and Armenia. on the Andamans and from India to Myanmar.

References

Moths described in 1847
Lithosiina
Moths of Europe
Moths of Asia